Chongqing is the largest of the four direct-controlled municipalities of the People's Republic of China and is further divided into 26 districts, 8 counties, and 4 autonomous counties.

It had 17 counties until October 2011, when Qijiang County and Wansheng District were merged to form the new Qijiang District, and Dazu County and Shuangqiao District were merged to form the new Dazu District.

From October 2011 to June 2014, Chongqing had 15 counties until Bishan and Tongliang Counties were upgraded into district status. Two further counties were upgraded into district Tongnan and Rongchang Counties  were upgraded into districts. In 2016 there  additional counties were upgraded into district Kaizhou, Wulong and Liangping.

Administrative divisions
All of these administrative divisions are explained in greater detail at Administrative divisions of the People's Republic of China. This chart lists only county-level divisions of Chongqing.

Recent changes in administrative divisions

Historical divisions

ROC (1911–1949)

Notes

References 

 
Chongqing
Administrative divisions of Chongqing